Kurdish culture is a group of distinctive cultural traits practiced by Kurdish people. The Kurdish culture is a legacy from ancient peoples who shaped modern Kurds and their society.

Kurds are an ethnic group mainly in Turkey, Iraq, and Iran. They live in the north of the Middle East along the Zagros Mountains and the Taurus Mountains in the region that the Kurds call Greater Kurdistan. Today they are parts of north-eastern Iraq, north-west of Iran and North East of Syria and southeast Turkey.

Miscellaneous

There is a lot of controversy about the Kurdish people from their origins, their history, and even their political future. Kurds are one of the largest ethnic groups that do not have an independent state recognized universally.

Language

Kurdish (Kurdî) is part of the North-Western division of the Iranian branch of the Indo-European language family. Basic languages are: Sorani and Kurmanji in various forms: Sorani, Armenian, Vile, Southern Kurdish, Royal, Zacakian, Bajalān, and Gorani. There are more than 30 million speakers of Kurdish in the Kurdistan region. Kurdish is written in the Arabic alphabet in Iraq and Syria, the adapted Arabic alphabet in Iran and the Latin script in Turkey. There are three main dialects: Kurmanji, Soriani and Pehlewani.

Folklore
The Kurds have a rich folkloric tradition which is increasingly endangered as a result of modernization, urbanization, and cultural repression. Kurds celebrate the new year on Newroz, and its celebration was often banned by authorities in Turkey and Syria. A well known Kurdish tale is Mem û Zîn.

Zembilfrosh  

Zembilfrosh (Kurdish for "basket seller") is a folktale popular in Turkish Kurdistan and Iraqi Kurdistan. Zembilfrosh was the son of a powerful Kurdish ruler who left his home and life behind to seek a spiritual life as a dervish. He wanders the countryside with his faithful wife, surviving by making and selling baskets. One day they arrive in the capital of a Kurdish emirate, where the prince's wife sees Zembilfrosh and falls in love with him. She summons him to the castle, where she declares her love for him and tries to seduce him. Zembilfrosh declines, but she presses, promising him many riches. Zembilfrosh is not persuaded and she locks him in a castle tower, from which he eventually escapes. The prince's wife then disguises herself and starts searching for Zembilfrosh, and eventually finds him. She then deceives Zembilfrosh's wife, convincing her to lend her her clothes and leave the house. When Zembilfrosh returns that night, it is dark and he does not recognize the prince's wife, who welcomes him into bed. However, a silver anklet gives her away, and he runs off, chased after by his would-be-lover. As Zembilfrosh sees that escape is impossible, he prays to God, supplicating to be released from a world of misery, and God complies. Reaching Zembilfrosh's lifeless body, the prince's wife is so heartbroken that she dies as well. They are then buried side by side. Their resting place is claimed to be located at the contemporary town of Batifa, a subdistrict of the district of Zakho, Duhok governorate, in Iraqi Kurdistan.

Music

Kurdish folk music is an important part of Kurdish culture and has traditionally been used to transmit stories about Kurdish history by Dengbêj (bards). According to thekurdishproject.org, 'The word ‘deng’ means voice and ‘bej’ means ‘to sing.’ Dengbej are best known for their “stran,” or song of mourning.' Many popular Kurdish musicians of the 20th century like Hassan Zirak and Ahmet Kaya sang in Turkish or Persian as well as in Kurdish.

Cuisine

Food is widely recognised to be a fundamental part of what it means to be Kurdish. Foods such as Dolma (rice stuffed in grape leaves), kfta (spiced minced meat cased in thin layer of mashed pudding rice), Ser u pe (goats head, tongue and feet), shifta (meat patties), are traditional Kurdish foods. Lamb and chicken have been staple meats in Kurdish cuisine for centuries. Vegetables, pilaf and dairy products also comprise a large portion of traditional Kurdish food. Tea is also staple to a Kurdish diet. It is commonly drunk 2-3 times a day, commonly a social activity. Kurds also drink Mastaw/Do'h/Ayran, a yogurt-based drink.

Religion

The Kurdish people have different religions depending on the country in which they live in or they have cultural and ethnic links to that religion, the most common religion among Kurds is Sunni Islam, practiced by 98% of Kurds living in Iraqi Kurdistan. The Kurds of Turkey are 30% Alevi out of a population of approximately 15-22 million Kurds and 68% follow Sunni Islam.

See also
 Kurdish cinema
 Kurdish dance
 Kurdish rugs
 Deq (tattoo)

References

External links
A Brief Survey of the History of the Kurds, by Kendal Nezan, President of the Kurdish Institute of Paris.
Gulan is a UK registered charity promoting the culture of Kurdistan.

 
Western Asian culture